The following is a list of waterfalls in the US state of Kentucky.

 Bad Branch Falls Kentucky, in Letcher County near source of Cumberland River
 Cumberland Falls, located in the Cumberland Falls State Resort Park
 Dog Slaughter Falls, located downstream of the Cumberland Falls State Resort Park
 Eagle Falls, located in the Cumberland Falls State Resort Park
 Northrup Falls, located one mile east of the Colditz Cove State Natural Area
 Seventy Six Falls, located in Clinton County, Kentucky
 Slave Falls, located on the Fork Ridge Road Sawmill Trailhead
 Star Creek Falls, located on the Cumberland River
 Tioga Falls located in West Point Ky
 Yahoo Falls, located in the Big South Fork National River and Recreation Area

See also
 List of waterfalls

References

Kentucky